Wang Wen-hsing was born in Fuzhou, Fujian, in 1939 and grew up in Taiwan. He obtained a BA in Foreign Languages and Literatures from National Taiwan University and an MFA in Creative Writing from the Iowa Writers' Workshop. He returned to NTU's Department of Foreign Languages and Literatures to teach, retiring in 2005 at the rank of Professor.

His first novel, Family Catastrophe, was published in 1972, a story about a runaway father and a son who takes over the household in his stead. He has also published a novel entitled Backed Against the Sea as well as several collections of short stories.

Bibliography of English translations

Books

Novels
 Family Catastrophe: A Modernist Novel. Tr. Susan Wan Dolling. Honolulu: Hawaii University Press, 2011.
 Backed Against the Sea. Trs. Ed. Gunn. Ithaca: Cornell East Asia Series, 1993.

Collections
 Endless War: Fiction and Essays by Wang Wen-hsing. Eds. Shu-ning Sciban and Fred Edwards. Ithaca: Cornell East Asia Program, 2011.

Uncollected short works
 "The Man in Black." Tr. Shen Li-fen. In Chi Pang-yuan et al., eds., An Anthology of Contemporary Chinese Literature. Taipei: National Institute for Compilation and Translation, 1975, II, 309–318.
 "Flaw." Tr. Ch'en Chu-yün. In Joseph S. M. Lau and Timothy A. Ross, eds., Chinese Stories from Taiwan: 1960–1970. New York: Columbia University Press, 1976.
 "Such a Symphony of Written Characters One Must Not Allow to Disperse." Tr. Helmut Martin. In Martin, ed., Modern Chinese Writers: Self-portrayals. Armonk, NY: M.E. Sharpe, 1992, 194–95.

Notes and references

External links
 Regularly maintained bibliography of translated works by Wang Wenxing at the MCLC translation database
 Wang Wenhsing Website constructed by National Chung-hsing University, Taiwan.

National Taiwan University alumni
Taiwanese male novelists
Chinese male novelists
Living people
Writers from Fuzhou
University of Iowa alumni
Academic staff of the National Taiwan University
Educators from Fujian
Taiwanese people from Fujian
Chinese male short story writers
Taiwanese male short story writers
20th-century Taiwanese short story writers
Year of birth missing (living people)
Republic of China short story writers
Short story writers from Fujian